Camden County High School is centrally located in Camden County, North Carolina. It is one of two high schools in the Camden County Schools system.

Camden County is a county bordering Pasquotank County, Currituck County, and the Virginia border. It is around a 45-minute drive from the Outer Banks of North Carolina.

References

Public high schools in North Carolina
Schools in Camden County, North Carolina